TMEM230 or transmembrane protein 230 is a protein that in humans is encoded by the TMEM230 gene.

Function

This gene encodes a multi-pass transmembrane protein that belongs to the TMEM134/TMEM230 protein family. The encoded protein localizes to secretory and recycling vesicles in the neuron and may be involved in synaptic vesicle trafficking and recycling. Mutations in this gene may be linked to familial Parkinson's disease.

References

Further reading